Jefferson Township is one of twenty townships in Fayette County, Iowa, USA.  As of the 2010 census, its population was 6,910.

Geography
According to the United States Census Bureau, Jefferson Township covers an area of 36.46 square miles (94.42 square kilometers); of this, 36.37 square miles (94.2 square kilometers, 99.77 percent) is land and 0.09 square miles (0.22 square kilometers, 0.23 percent) is water.

Cities, towns, villages
 Oelwein

Adjacent townships
 Harlan Township (north)
 Smithfield Township (northeast)
 Scott Township (east)
 Buffalo Township, Buchanan County (southeast)
 Hazleton Township, Buchanan County (south)
 Fairbank Township, Buchanan County (southwest)
 Oran Township (west)
 Fremont Township (northwest)

Cemeteries
The township contains these three cemeteries: Oakdale, Otsego and Woodlawn.

Major highways
  Iowa Highway 3
  Iowa Highway 150

Airports and landing strips
 Mercy Hospital Heliport

Landmarks
 Levin Park
 Platt Park
 Red Gate Park
 Reedy Park
 Wings Park

School districts
 Oelwein Community School District
 West Central Community School District

Political districts
 Iowa's 1st congressional district
 State House District 18
 State Senate District 9

References
 United States Census Bureau 2008 TIGER/Line Shapefiles
 United States Board on Geographic Names (GNIS)
 United States National Atlas

External links
 US-Counties.com
 City-Data.com

Townships in Fayette County, Iowa
Townships in Iowa